Hexamethylene diisocyanate (HDI) is the organic compound with the formula (CH2)6(NCO)2.  It is classified as an diisocyanate. It is a colorless liquid. It has sometimes been called HMDI but this not usually done to avoid confusion with Hydrogenated MDI.

Synthesis
Compared to other commercial diisocyanates, HDI is produced in relatively small quantities, accounting for (with isophorone diisocyanate) only 3.4% of the global diisocyanate market in the year 2000. It is produced by phosgenation of hexamethylene diamine.

Applications
Aliphatic diisocyanates are used in specialty applications, such as enamel coatings which are resistant to abrasion and degradation by ultraviolet light. These properties are particularly desirable in, for instance, the exterior paint applied to aircraft and vessels. HDI is also sold oligomerized as the trimer or biuret which are used in automotive refinish coatings. Although more viscous in these forms, it reduces the volatility and toxicity. At least 3 companies sell material in this form commercially. It is also used as an activator in process of in situ polymerization of caprolactam i.e. cast nylon process. HDI is also used bisoxazolidine synthesis as the hydroxyl group on the molecule allows for further reaction with hexamethylene diisocyanate.

Toxicity
HDI is considered toxic, and its pulmonary toxicity has been studied as well as its oligomers.

See also
 Methylene diphenyl diisocyanate
 Toluene diisocyanate
 Isophorone diisocyanate

References

External links
 NIOSH Safety and Health Topic: Isocyanates, from the website of the National Institute for Occupational Safety and Health (NIOSH)
 NIOSH Pocket Guide to Chemical Hazards - Hexamethylene diisocyanate 

Isocyanates